Hopewell is a ghost town located in Calhoun County, Mississippi, United States. A post office operated under the name Hopewell from 1840 to 1905.

References

Former populated places in Calhoun County, Mississippi
Former populated places in Mississippi